SNAP! is a quarterly magazine dedicated to art, fashion and culture in Canada. Each issue is devoted to a particular theme.

History 
SNAP!  was established in Montreal by Australians Hannah Byrne and Shayl Prisk in 2008.  The magazine had Montreal-only distribution for the first 13 issues but has since expanded and is now distributed across Canada.

References

External links 
 

Quarterly magazines published in Canada
Visual arts magazines published in Canada
Magazines established in 2008
English-language magazines
Magazines published in Montreal